Pictor A, around 485 million light-years away in the constellation Pictor, is a double-lobed broad-line radio galaxy and a powerful source of radio waves in the Southern Celestial Hemisphere. From a supermassive black hole at its centre, a relativistic jet shoots out to an X-ray hot spot 300,000 light years away.

References

Pictor (constellation)
Radio galaxies